Homer Thomas Thompson (June 1, 1891 – September 12, 1957) was a catcher in Major League Baseball who made one game appearance for the New York Highlanders in its 1912 season. Thompson batted and threw right-handed. He was born in Spring City, Tennessee and died in Atlanta, Georgia.

Thompson attended the University of Georgia. He was the younger brother of another former Highlander, Tommy Thompson.

External links
Career statistics and player information from Baseball Reference, or Baseball Reference (Minors), or Retrosheet

1891 births
1957 deaths
Baseball players from Tennessee
Denver Grizzlies (baseball) players
Columbus Foxes players
Georgia Bulldogs baseball players
New York Highlanders players
People from Spring City, Tennessee
University of Georgia alumni